Jordan McLaughlin (born April 9, 1996) is an American professional basketball player for the Minnesota Timberwolves of the National Basketball Association (NBA). He played college basketball for the USC Trojans.

High school career
McLaughlin is the son of Thomas McLaughlin, who played minor league baseball, and has an older sister, Amber. Growing up, Jordan played baseball and football but gravitated towards basketball. McLaughlin attended Etiwanda High School in Rancho Cucamonga, California. He scored 19 points in the 2013 Chicago Elite Classic. He committed to the USC Trojans over scholarship offers from Kansas and UCLA. USC coach Andy Enfield made him a recruiting priority after seeing him at an AAU game. McLaughlin had previously crossed USC off his list after seeing former coach Kevin O'Neill berate an injured player at a practice.

College career

In his freshman season, USC won 12 games. He averaged 12.1 points and 4.5 assists per game but missed the end of the season with a shoulder injury. McLaughlin led USC to the NCAA Tournament in 2016, and averaged 13.4 points per game on 47 percent shooting. He led the team back to the NCAA tournament in 2017, posting 12.9 points, 3.6 rebounds and 5.5 assists per game. Coming into his senior year, he was named to the preseason Bob Cousy Award Watchlist. As a senior at USC, McLaughlin averaged 12.8 points, 7.8 assists, 3.7 rebounds and 2.0 steals in 35.3 minutes per game, shooting 39.7 percent from behind the arc. He was a First Team All-Pac-12 selection. McLaughlin was named to the All-District IX Team by the USBWA and First Team All-District 20 by the NABC. His assists per game was the third highest in Division I, and McLaughlin was the third Pac-12 player ever to record more than 600 assists and 1,600 points over a career.

Professional career

Long Island Nets (2018–2019)
After going undrafted in the 2018 NBA draft, McLaughlin signed with the Brooklyn Nets for NBA summer league play. He was also invited to training camp. He scored seven points and six assists in 90–76 summer league loss to the Oklahoma City Thunder on July 7. McLaughlin later joined the Nets on a training camp deal. He was waived by the Nets on October 11, but was signed to the training camp roster of the Nets’ NBA G League affiliate, the Long Island Nets.

Minnesota Timberwolves (2019–present)
On July 20, 2019, McLaughlin signed a two-way contract with the Minnesota Timberwolves. On February 8, 2020, he recorded a career-high in points (24) and assists (11) against the LA Clippers.

On September 15, 2021, McLaughlin signed a standard contract with Minnesota.

Career statistics

NBA

Regular season

|-
| style="text-align:left;"| 
| style="text-align:left;"| Minnesota
| 30 || 2 || 19.7 || .489 || .382 || .667 || 1.6 || 4.2 || 1.1 || .1 || 7.6
|-
| style="text-align:left;"| 
| style="text-align:left;"| Minnesota
| 51 || 2 || 18.4 || .413 || .359 || .767 || 2.1 || 3.8 || 1.0 || .1 || 5.0
|-
| style="text-align:left;"| 
| style="text-align:left;"| Minnesota
| 62 || 3 || 14.5 || .440 || .318 || .750 || 1.5 || 2.9 || .9 || .2 || 3.8
|- class="sortbottom"
| style="text-align:center;" colspan="2"|Career
| 143 || 7 || 17.0 || .444 || .352 || .725 || 1.8 || 3.5 || 1.0 || .1 || 5.0

Playoffs

|-
| style="text-align:left;"|2022
| style="text-align:left;"|Minnesota
| 5 || 0 || 16.6 || .706|| .571 || .750 || 2.4 || 3.4 || 1.0 || .0 || 6.2
|- class="sortbottom"
| style="text-align:center;" colspan="2"|Career
| 5 || 0 || 16.6 || .706|| .571 || .750 || 2.4 || 3.4 || 1.0 || .0 || 6.2

References

External links
USC Trojans bio

1996 births
Living people
American men's basketball players
Basketball players from Pasadena, California
Iowa Wolves players
Long Island Nets players
Minnesota Timberwolves players
People from Rancho Cucamonga, California
Point guards
Sportspeople from San Bernardino County, California
Undrafted National Basketball Association players
USC Trojans men's basketball players